Reig's tuco-tuco (Ctenomys osvaldoreigi) is a species of rodent in the family Ctenomyidae. It is endemic to central Argentina, where it is known only from a grassland location in Cordoba Province at an elevation above 2000 m in the Sierras Grandes. The species is threatened by disruption of its habitat by fire and sheep grazing. It is named after Argentine biologist Osvaldo Reig (1929–1992).

References

Mammals of Argentina
Tuco-tucos
Endemic fauna of Argentina
Mammals described in 1995